Chen Yongqiang may refer to:

Chen Yongqiang (sports shooter) (born 1974), Chinese sports shooter
Chen Yongqiang (footballer) (born 1978), Chinese footballer
Chen Yongqiang (painter)